Everybody's in Show-Biz is the eleventh studio album released by the English rock group the Kinks, released in 1972. A double album, the first disc features studio recordings, while the second disc documents a two-night Carnegie Hall stand.

Everybody's in Show-Biz is often seen by fans as a transition album for the Kinks, marking the change in Ray Davies' songwriting style toward more theatrical, campy and vaudevillian work, as evidenced by the rock-opera concept albums that followed it.

This album marks Davies' explorations of the trials of rock-star life and the monotony of touring, themes that would reappear in future releases like The Kinks Present A Soap Opera and the 1987 live album Live: The Road.

On 3 June 2016, a Legacy Edition was released, with disc 1 containing the original stereo album (studio and live tracks) and disc 2 containing bonus tracks including previously unreleased live tracks from the Carnegie Hall concerts, alternate mixes and studio outtakes. (Disc 2 tracks 6-10 were recorded on the other night of the two-night Carnegie Hall stand; Disc 2 track 14 is a previously-unreleased outtake; and Disc 2 tracks 1 and 12 are the same as those bonus tracks on the 1998 reissue.)

Track listing

Personnel 
The Kinks
Ray Davies – lead vocals, acoustic guitar, resonator guitar
Dave Davies – lead guitar, slide guitar, banjo, backing vocals, 12-string acoustic guitar on "Celluloid Heroes", lead vocal on "You Don't Know My Name", co-lead vocals on "Hot Potatoes"
John Dalton – bass guitar, backing vocals
Mick Avory – drums
John Gosling – keyboards

Additional personnel
Alan Holmes – saxophone, clarinet
Mike Cotton – trumpet
John Beecham – trombone, tuba
Dave Rowberry – organ on "Celluloid Heroes"

References

External links 
 

The Kinks albums
1972 albums
RCA Records albums
Albums produced by Ray Davies
Albums recorded at Morgan Sound Studios
Rock albums by English artists